Antoon van Schendel (Lage Zwaluwe, 9 May 1910 — Muret, France, 6 August 1990) was a Dutch professional road bicycle racer. Born in the Netherlands, Antoon van Schendel became a professional cyclist in France. The highlight of his career was his stage victory in the 1938 Tour de France. Antoon van Schendel was an older brother of cyclist Albert van Schendel, who also won one stage in the Tour de France.

Major results

1935
Circuit de Samatan
GP Beauville
GP Peugeot
1938
Tour de France:
Winner stage 10A

External links 

Official Tour de France results for Antoon van Schendel

1910 births
1990 deaths
Dutch male cyclists
Dutch Tour de France stage winners
People from Drimmelen
Cyclists from North Brabant